The 2004 Danmark Rundt was held from 4–8 August 2004. It was the 14th edition of the men's stage race, which was established in 1985.

Stages

Stage 1: Aabenraa – Esbjerg (150 km)

Stage 2: Varde – Århus (185 km)

Stage 3: Århus – Vejle (115 km)

Stage 4: Fredericia, (11.7 km, ITT)

Stage 5: Odense – Roskilde (195 km)

Stage 6: Taastrup – Frederiksberg (195 km)

Final classifications

Overall classement (yellow jersey)

Kurt Asle Arvesen's average speed for the race was 40.621 km/h.

Point classement (purple jersey)

Hill classement (red-dotted jersey)

Youth classement (white jersey)

Team classement

Fighter classement

The order was decided by the same jury that gives the points throughout the race.

References
cyclingnews

Danmark Rundt
Danmark Rundt
Danmark Rundt, 2004
August 2004 sports events in Europe